Bréxent-Énocq is a commune in the Pas-de-Calais department in the Hauts-de-France region in northern France.

Geography
A village situated some 5 miles (8 km) northeast of Montreuil-sur-Mer on the D146 road.

Population

See also
Communes of the Pas-de-Calais department

References

Communes of Pas-de-Calais